Davao del Norte, officially the Province of Davao del Norte, is a province in the Philippines located in the Davao Region in Mindanao. Its capital and largest city is Tagum. The province also includes Samal Island to the south in Davao Gulf.

Before 1967, the five provinces—Davao de Oro, Davao del Norte, Davao del Sur, Davao Occidental, Davao Oriental—and Guipuzcoa were administered as a single province named Davao, a provincial district of the Department of Mindanao and Sulu. The present-day Davao Region is coterminous with this former province.

Davao del Norte is also known as "The Banana Capital of the Philippines."

History

Davao del Norte and Davao de Oro (Compostela Valley) by R.A. 8470, January 30, 1998, together with Davao Oriental, and Davao Occidental from Davao del Sur by R.A. 10360, July 23, 2013, used to be a whole province simply known as Davao Region. This original province was split into three: Davao del Norte, Davao Oriental, and Davao del Sur when Republic Act No. 4867 (authored by Representative Lorenzo S. Sarmiento, Sr.) was signed into law on May 8, 1967, by President Ferdinand Marcos.

Davao del Norte originally comprised thirteen municipalities: Asuncion, Babak (now in Samal), Compostela, Kapalong, Mabini, Mawab, Monkayo, Nabunturan, Panabo, Pantukan, Samal, Santo Tomas and Tagum. On May 6, 1970, six more municipalities were created: Carmen, Kaputian (now in Samal), Maco, Montevista, New Bataan, and New Corella.

The passage of Republic Act No. 6430 on June 17, 1972, changed the name of the province from Davao del Norte to Davao.

By 1996, Davao had a total of twenty-two municipalities with the creation of San Vicente (now Laak) in 1979, Maragusan in 1988, and Talaingod in 1991.

On January 31, 1998, President Fidel V. Ramos signed Republic Act No. 8470, which split the province into two, creating the province of Davao de Oro (Compostela Valley). In the meantime, Davao was renamed back to Davao del Norte. Together with the creation of the new province, two cities and one municipality were created: the municipality of Tagum, capital of Davao del Norte, was converted into a city (R.A. 8472); Samal, Babak, and Kaputian were joined into the city of Samal (R.A. 8471); and the municipality of Braulio E. Dujali was created out of several barangays in Panabo and Carmen (R.A. 8473). The province then had 8 municipalities and 2 cities.

Republic Act No. 9015, signed into law on March 5, 2001, by President Gloria Macapagal Arroyo, converted the municipality of Panabo into a city. Republic Act No. 9265, approved on March 15, 2004, created the municipality of San Isidro from Asuncion and Kapalong.

Geography
Davao del Norte covers a total area of  occupying the north-central section of the Davao Region. The province borders Agusan del Sur to the north, Bukidnon to the west, Davao de Oro to the east, and Davao City to the south.

Samal is the only municipality or city in the province not situated on Mindanao island. The city covers the entire Samal and Talikud Islands within Davao Gulf.

Administrative divisions
Davao del Norte comprises eight municipalities and three cities.

Demographics

Davao del Norte had a population of 1,125,057 in the 2020 census. The main languages spoken are Cebuano and Davawenyo. English and Filipino are also widely spoken.

Indigenous groups
Talaingod is the home of many indigenous groups in Davao del Norte, with most of them Lumads and Aetas.

Economy

Davao del Norte is a primarily agricultural, but also engages in mining, forestry, and commercial fishing.

The principal crops of the province include rice, maize, banana, coconut, abacá, ramie, coffee, and a variety of fruit and root crops. Davao del Norte is the country's leading producer of bananas, with many plantations run by multinationals Dole and Del Monte, and local producers such as Lapanday, TADECO, and Marsman. Davao del Norte is also one of Mindanao's leading producer of rice.

Davao Gulf, to the south of the province, provides a living for many fishermen. Some of the fish products include brackish water milkfish, tilapia, shrimp, and crab; and freshwater catfish and tilapia.

Davao del Norte is a major producer of gold, and its mining resources include silica, silver, copper and elemental sulfur. Small-scale gold mining activities thrive in several areas. There are also numerous active quarries of commercial quantities of gravel, sand, and pebbles for construction.

Tourism is also a major part of the economy of Davao del Norte. There are a lot of beaches on Samal Island, the most famous of which is Pearl Farm Beach Resort. Banana Beach Resort is the most famous beach outside of Samal Island.

Commerce is also a major part of the economy of Davao del Norte. There are lot of shopping malls in Tagum.

References

External links

 
 

 
Provinces of the Philippines
Provinces of the Davao Region
States and territories established in 1967
1967 establishments in the Philippines